The 2021–22 Ukrainian Cup was the 31st annual season of Ukraine's football knockout competition. The competition started on 4 August 2021 and was expected to be concluded on 11 May 2022 with the final. The Ukrainian Association of Football announced that the new competition sponsor is a betting company VBet, same as for the Ukrainian Premier League. Dynamo Kyiv were the two-time defending winners.

All competition rounds consist of a single game with a home field advantage granted to a team from lower league. Draw for all the rounds is blind. Qualification for the competition was granted to all professional clubs and two better of the 2020–21 Ukrainian Amateur Cup. Higher-tier teams enter the competition later (gain bye) than lower-tier teams.

At an extraordinary general meeting on 26 April 2022, the competition was abandoned due to the Russian invasion of Ukraine.

Team allocation and schedule 
The competition includes all professional first teams from the Premier League (16/16 teams of the league), First League (16/16), Second League (31/31) and two semifinal teams from the previous year's Amateur Cup since two other semifinal teams joined ranks of the Second League including the winner LNZ Cherkasy.

Rounds schedule

Competition schedule 
Legends: AM – AAFU (amateur) competitions (IV tier), 2L – Second League (III tier), 1L – First League (II tier), PL – Premier League (I tier)

First preliminary round (1/128)
In this round, 8 clubs from the Second League and 2 semifinalists of the 2020–21 Ukrainian Amateur Cup entered the competition.

The draw was held on 27 July 2021.

Second preliminary round (1/64) 

In this round, 16 clubs from the First League and 23 clubs from the Second League enter the competition and join the 5 winners of the First preliminary round (3 clubs from Second League, 2 – amateurs).

The draw was held on 6 August 2021.

Third preliminary round (1/32) 
In this round participate the 22 winners of the Second preliminary round (10 clubs from First League, 12 – Second League).

The draw was held on 19 August 2021.

Round of 32 
In this round, 11 clubs from the Premier League (lower ranked) enter the competition and join the 11 winners of the Third preliminary round (7 clubs from First League, 4 – Second League). 

The draw was held on 3 September 2021.

Round of 16 
In this round, rest of 5 clubs from the Premier League (upper ranked) enter the competition and join the 11 winners of the Round of 32 (8 clubs from Premier League, 2 – First League, 1 – Second League). 

The draw for round of 16 was held on 24 September 2021.

Quarter-finals 
This round includes one team from the First League (Metalist Kharkiv) and 7 clubs from the Premier League. Base date for the matches is 1–2–3 March 2022.

The draw for quarter-finals was held on 15 December 2021.

Semi-finals 
The draw for semi-finals and final was meant be held on 3 March 2022.

Final

Bracket

Top goalscorers 
The competition's top ten goalscorers including preliminary rounds.

Notes:

See also 
2021–22 Ukrainian Premier League
2021–22 Ukrainian First League
2021–22 Ukrainian Second League
2021–22 Ukrainian Amateur Cup

Notes

References

External links
 The season's calendar planner. Ukrainian Premier League. (pdf format)

Cup
Ukrainian Cup
Ukrainian Cup seasons
Sports events affected by the 2022 Russian invasion of Ukraine